Oh! Calcutta! is an avant-garde, risque theatrical revue created by British drama critic Kenneth Tynan. The show, consisting of sketches on sex-related topics, debuted Off-Broadway in 1969 and then in the West End in 1970. It ran in London for over 3,900 performances, and in New York initially for 1,314. Revivals enjoyed even longer runs, including a Broadway revival that ran for 5,959 performances, making the show the longest-running revue in Broadway history at the time.

As of 2018, its revival was still the longest-running revue in Broadway history; the second longest-running revival, after Chicago; and the eighth longest-running Broadway show ever.

The show sparked considerable controversy at the time due to its extended scenes of total nudity, both male and female. The title is taken from a painting by Clovis Trouille, itself a  pun on "O quel cul t'as!", French for "Oh, what an arse you have!"

Background
Tynan came up with the idea of putting on an erotic revue in early summer of 1966. Tynan had hoped that Harold Pinter would direct the production, in order to give it avant-garde legitimacy, but Pinter declined. Sketches were written by, among others, Samuel Beckett, John Lennon, Sam Shepard, Leonard Melfi, Edna O'Brien, Sherman Yellen, Jules Feiffer and Tynan, and featured the cast nude. Peter Schickele (also known as the creator of PDQ Bach), Robert Dennis and Stanley Walden were the revue's composers, known as The Open Window. Beckett's contribution, Breath, was used as a Prologue in the original New York staging, but Beckett eventually withdrew permission for its use. Tynan commissioned British Pop artist Pauline Boty to make a series of paintings of erogenous zones on which the revue would be based. Boty died of cancer in July 1966 so only managed to complete one painting, her last: BUM.

Productions
The musical opened off-Broadway at the Eden Theatre on June 21, 1969, transferred to the Belasco Theatre on February 17, 1971, and closed on August 12, 1972, after a total of 1,314 performances. It was directed by Jacques Levy (later the songwriting partner of Bob Dylan on his album Desire) and choreographed by Margo Sappington. The cast included Sappington, as well as future television stars Bill Macy and Alan Rachins, as well as Leon Russom, Nancy Tribush, Philip Gibson and George Welbes, and three "Open Window" composers.

The musical premiered in London on July 27, 1970, at The Roundhouse, and transferred to the West End Royalty Theatre on September 30, 1970, running through January 27, 1974. The show then transferred to the Duchess Theatre on January 28, 1974, where it ran until February 1980, for a total of 3,918 performances. The London show was produced by Michael White.

A revival opened on Broadway at the Edison Theatre on September 24, 1976 and closed on August 6, 1989 after 5,959 performances, again directed and choreographed by Levy and Sappington. The revival briefly became the longest-running show in Broadway history. It remains Broadway's eighth longest-running show and the longest-running revue in Broadway history.

The Spanish-language premiere production opened on October 9, 1977 at Teatro Príncipe in Madrid, Spain, directed by Juan 
José Alonso Millán, who also translated the show.

Filmed recording
A pay-per-view video production played on closed-circuit television in select cities in 1971, and was released theatrically in 1972; in both cases many cities and municipalities banned its screening. Frank Herold, an editor who worked on the film, provides commentary on this in a brief post he contributed to the Internet Movie Database page.

Synopsis
Note: the revue takes place in the form of sketches. These are taken from the 1971 pay-per-view production with lyrics and music by Robert Dennis, Peter Schickele and Stanley Walden (unless otherwise noted).

Act 1
Prologue Samuel Beckett's "Breath" (until licence withdrawn by author)

Taking Off the Robe
The actors dance and remove their robes to the opening song ("Taking Off the Robe" (Oh! Calcutta!)).

Jack & Jill
A boy and a girl who just met are in their own playland, with the boy constantly trying to find ways to seduce the girl, who is afraid of him because he is a boy. The sketch ends with the girl in a coma after the boy rapes her ("Jack & Jill").

A Suite of Five Letters
A song of five letters written by anonymous authors about their sexual preferences ("Suite for Five Letters"). They were actual letters to the editor from various newspapers from olden times in London and, later in the Suite, contemporary letters from sexual newspapers of the day.

Dick and Jane
An uptight girl gets a lesson in loosening up after her lover is sick of her constantly stiff ways ("Dick & Jane").

Will Answer All Serious Replies
A young couple starts to rethink getting into the swingers lifestyle after meeting the middle-aged couple who answers their ad ("(Will Answer All) Sincere Replies").

Delicious Indignities
A chaste woman is caught by her admirer, who then proceeds to learn that she is not as chaste as he thinks she is ("Delicious Indignities (or The Deflowering of Helen Axminster") was written by Sherman Yellen).

Was It Good for You, Too?
A man participates in a sex study and the whole experience ends up turning into one big farce ("Was It Good For You Too? (Green Pants, I Like the Look)"). The scene plays like the Marx Brothers at a sex research facility.

Act 2
"Who, Whom (Exchanges of Information)" (added during run)

Life Is Over Much Too Soon
A pre-recorded section, where the actors are nude outside doing interpretive dance ("Much Too Soon", music and lyrics by Jacques Levy, Dennis, Schickele and Walden).

One on One
Another nude interpretive dance ("One on One (Clarence and Mildred)").

Rock Garden
After a man rambles on about painting the fence and building a rock garden, his son talks about what girls really like ("Rock Garden").

Four in Hand
A newcomer to a masturbation game cannot seem to think of anything to masturbate to ("Four in Hand")  (this sketch's first draft was written by John Lennon).

Finale
Players come out to sing the finale, also doing voiceover as to what the theater patrons are really thinking about the experience. Examples include: "She has pretty eyes" (the joke being that all of the actors are nude at this point), "How come none of the guys have hard-ons?" "That's my boyfriend—that IS a hard-on" and "If they showed this in Washington, Agnew would shit!" ("Coming Together, Going Together").

Critical response
Clive Barnes, in his 1969 review for The New York Times, wrote that "the humor is so doggedly sophomoric and soporific", adding "The failure here is almost exclusively a failure of the writers and the producers. The director, Jacques Levy, has done his best with the weak material at hand ... the nude scenes, while derivative, are attractive enough. The best effects—including the rather sweet grope-in immediately after the intermission—have been taken from Robert Joffrey's ballet 'Astarte', and the show uses the same projected media designers ... In sum, Oh! Calcutta! is likely to disappoint different people in different ways, but disappointment is the order of the night."

Irving Wardle, writing in The Times in 1970, said: "I have seen better revues than Oh! Calcutta! but none based on ideas that strike me as more sympathetic. Namely that the ordinary human body is an object well worth attention: and that there is no reason why the public treatment of sex should not be extended to take in not only lyricism and personal emotion but also the rich harvest of bawdy jokes." He noted that the enjoyment and lack of embarrassment of the cast helped the audience to accept the more insubstantial elements of the revue's material and that the stage sets' screen projections assisted the dance numbers considerably, concluding: "In many ways, it is a ghastly show: ill-written, juvenile, and attention-seeking. But it is not a menace."

Obscenity allegations
The 1970 production at The Roundhouse, London, attracted the attention of the Metropolitan Police's Obscene Publications Squad, which sent two officers to a preview of the show. One of the officers returned twice more, before recommending a prosecution under the Theatres Act 1968 for obscenity. The Director of Public Prosecutions sent its panel of experts, including two retired headmistresses, to see The Roundhouse production. Their judgement that it was not obscene enabled it to transfer to London's West End.

References

External links
 
 
 
 BroadwayWorld listing

British plays
1969 plays
Revues
1969 musicals
Broadway musicals
Plays by Sam Shepard
Obscenity controversies in theatre